Lobelia aberdarica is a species of plant in the family Campanulaceae. It is restricted to the uplands of Kenya and Uganda (1860-3350m). It has been found in the forests of Cherangani hills, Kenya. Its natural habitats are lower and upper montane and subalpine swamps and meadows. It has been brought into cultivation.

References

aberdarica
Least concern plants
Flora of Kenya
Flora of Uganda
Taxonomy articles created by Polbot
Afromontane flora